Vladimir Vauhnik (1896—1955) was Yugoslav military officer of Slovenian extraction. Vauhnik is most notable for his Counterintelligence activities before and during World War II that could have changed the course of the war.

Early life 

Vauhnik was born on 24 June 1896 in Svetinje, Austria-Hungary (modern-day Slovenia) into a patriotic Slovenian family and was drawn to the military even as a young boy. He completed First Gymnasium in Maribor, became a cadet, and later enrolled in the Theresian Military Academy near Vienna. His parents were teachers.

After World War I, he  returned to newly established Yugoslavia and participated in the Austro-Slovene conflict in Carinthia. He was decorated by Yugoslav authorities for his bravery in this conflict and promoted to the rank of Captain.

Prelude to World War II 
Vauhnik was probably the first in the world who presented information that the Nazi Germany would invade Poland and Yugoslavia and later Soviet Union, based on the covert and legal methods he used.

Based on the orders of Milan Nedić, who was Minister of Defence of the Kingdom of Yugoslavia, Vauhnik visited German supreme command twice, to secure Yugoslav interest in the port of Thessaloniki.

His colleagues during military education in École spéciale militaire de Saint-Cyr in France included Draža Mihailović.

During World War II 
Before the outbreak of the World War II Vauhnik had the rank of Colonel as a military attaché in Berlin where he closely cooperated with Ivo Andrić.

According to his own testimony, by 14 March 1941 Vauhnik had "irrefutable proof and even fairly detailed plans" about the initiation of preparations for attacks on Soviet Union by German forces. He emphasized that government of the United Kingdom was informed about those plans.

After Axis invasion of Yugoslavia, Vauhnik was captured in Belgrade and transported to Berlin at the beginning of May 1941 where he was interrogated in Reich Security Main Office. He was released as German citizen because he was born in part of Yugoslavia which was annexed by Germany at that time. After his release Vauhnik went to Ljubljana.

In 1942, Vauhnik forged a plan to transport King Peter II of Yugoslavia to Axis occupied Yugoslavia to mobilize Serbs and Croats under his command. His plan was based on the fact that German forces were entingled on Eastern Front while Italians could be convinced not to interfere.

Vauhnik was a coworker of Ivan Prezelj, commander of Slovenian Chetniks (Blue Guard). Vauhnik was initiator for establishment of the Military Council of all Slovene liberal political movements. Vauhnik was at that time on the position of acting commander of the Headquarter of the Chetniks in Slovenia. In 1944 Draža Mihailović promoted Vauhnik to rank of Brigadier General. According to Chetnik voivode Šušterič, Vauhnik and Mihailović were blood brothers.

According to some sources, Vauhnik travelled to Switzerland in June 1944 to offer to put Slovenian domobranci, some soldiers of Independent State of Croatia and some Chetnik units under British command. His offer was rejected by the British representatives.

After World War II 
After World War II Vauhnik went to Buenos Aires,  Argentina, where he lived quietly without joining any Yugoslav  émigré groups. Vauhnik died on 31 May 1955, aged 58, in Buenos Aires.

Bibliography
Works by/about Vauhnik include:

References

Sources 

 
 
 
 
 
 
 
 
 
 
 

People from the Municipality of Ormož
École Spéciale Militaire de Saint-Cyr alumni
Chetnik personnel of World War II
1896 births
1955 deaths
Slovenian Chetnik personnel of World War II
Slovenian emigrants to Argentina
Yugoslav emigrants to Argentina